Michael Chang was the defending champion but lost in the second round to Martin Damm.

Greg Rusedski won in the final 7–6(7–5), 6–4 against Damm.

Seeds

  Michael Chang (second round)
  Todd Woodbridge (first round)
  Hendrik Dreekmann (quarterfinals)
  Byron Black (semifinals)
  Sjeng Schalken (quarterfinals)
  Patrick Rafter (first round)
  Vince Spadea (second round)
  Kenneth Carlsen (first round)

Draw

Finals

Top half

Bottom half

References
 1996 Salem Open Beijing Draw

Singles